Ring of the Nibelungs may refer to:

 Der Ring des Nibelungen, (The Ring of the Nibelung or The Nibelung's Ring,) a group of epic operas by Richard Wagner
 Dark Kingdom: The Dragon King, also titled Ring of the Nibelungs, Die Nibelungen, Curse of the Ring, and Sword of Xanten, a fantasy film directed by Uli Eden

See also
 Nibelungenlied (The Song of the Nibelungs), an epic poem by an unknown author 

ru:Кольцо Нибелунгов